The Cove may refer to:

Places
 The Cove (Stamford, Connecticut), a neighborhood
 The Cove, New Zealand, a settlement near Dunedin, New Zealand
 The Cove, Penang, a residential complex near George Town in Penang, Malaysia
 The Cove, a grouping of three megaliths at Avebury
 The Cove Palisades State Park, Oregon, United States
 The Cove, a coastal village outside of Baltimore, Ireland.

Other uses
 The Cove (film), a 2009 documentary film that describes the annual killing of dolphins in a National Park at Taiji, Wakayama
 The Cove (novel), a 2012 novel by Ron Rash
 "The Cove", nickname of the supporters of Australian soccer team Sydney FC
 The Cove Atlantis, a hotel in the Bahamas
 The Cove FC, an association football team based in Adelaide, Australia

See also
 Cove (disambiguation)
 Cove, a geographical feature